Terri Hawkes (born ) is a Canadian actress and writer, known for playing Kelly Hennenlotter in the horror film, Hello Mary Lou: Prom Night II, Adrienne in Beverly Hills 90210, Wendy Masters in General Hospital, and for being the second English dub voice actress of the title character of the Japanese anime Sailor Moon. She is the daughter of politician Jim Hawkes.

Hawkes' other voice acting roles include Baby Hugs Bear in The Care Bears Movie, and reprised the role in Nelvana's Care Bears TV show, where she also voiced Shreeky (No Heart's niece). Hawkes also had a role playing Monika Barnes in the early episodes of Traders, and also was the voice of a 3D sphere in Max Maven's The MAXimum Dimension. Hawkes also worked as a voice director for the popular children's animated series Flying Rhino Junior High, and the English version of the 1996 Canadian Horror film Karmina and was an assistant voice director for Sailor Moon.

She also wrote the screenplay of the 2002 film The Book of Eve and one episode of the Canadian children's animated series Anne of Green Gables: The Animated Series which was broadcast on TVO in Canada and PBS in America. Since 2007, Hawkes has concentrated on writing and directing, with a focus on works that empower women. She finished an M.A in Gender, Feminist and Women's Studies, and is currently working on a doctorate in Gender Feminist and Women's Studies at York University.

She currently lives with her two children in Toronto, Ontario.

In May 2017, Hawkes divorced from her husband, retired producer Jeff Sackman. Sackman was the founder of the defunct film company thinkfilm.

Filmography

Films

Films (animated & anime)

Television

Television (animated & anime)

Web series

References

External links
Official site of Terri Hawkes (Voice Actor) (archived at the Wayback Machine)
YTV interview from 10/17/00

1958 births
Living people
Actresses from Calgary
Actresses from Toronto
Canadian emigrants to the United States
Canadian film actresses
Canadian television actresses
Canadian voice actresses
Canadian television writers
Canadian women screenwriters
University of Calgary alumni
University of California, Los Angeles alumni
Canadian voice directors
Canadian women television writers
Writers from Calgary
Writers from Toronto
York University alumni
20th-century Canadian actresses
20th-century Canadian screenwriters
20th-century Canadian women writers
21st-century Canadian actresses
21st-century Canadian screenwriters
21st-century Canadian women writers